Soolamangalam Jayalakshmi and Soolamangalam Rajalakshmi, popularly known as Soolamangalam Sisters were Carnatic music sister-pair vocalists and musicians known for their devotional songs in Tamil. They were early singers in the trend of duo singing in Carnatic music, which started in the 1950s, with performers like Radha Jayalakshmi, and later continued by Bombay Sisters, Ranjani-Gayatri, Mambalam Sisters, Bangalore Sisters and Priya Sisters. The Soolamangalam Sisters are best known for singing the Kanda Shasti Kavasam, a hymn on the Hindu god Muruga.

Early life and background
Born in Soolamangalam, a village with musical heritage in Thanjavur district of Tamil Nadu, of Karnam Ramaswmai Ayyar and Janaki Ammal, the sisters had their training in music from K. G. Murthi of Soolamangalam, Pathamadai S. Krishnan, and Mayavaram Venugopalayyar.

The duo-sisters were very popular for their matchless rendition of national and devotional songs. They had a hectic practice for about three decades and were much sought after for providing background music in films. Their Kanda Shasti Kavasam album is very popular with the Lord Muruga devotees.

Notable songs

Awards
 Muruga Ganamrtha
 Kuyil Isai Thilakam
 Isaiarasi
 Nadhakanal
 Kalaimamani in 1992 by Tamil Nadu Eyal Isai Nataka Mandram.

Filmography
Among the two of them, Jayalakshmi had rendered only a few songs in films and most of it would be duets with Rajalakshmi, whereas Rajalakshmi had more chance as a playback singer in films. Her voice suits all the categories of youthful, soft mellifluousness, evocative feelings, perfection of pronunciation and the best in devotional songs.

Music composers Rajalakshmi sang for 
Many of Rajalakshmi's songs are under K. V. Mahadevan's music direction all the while. Many of her songs were under T. G. Lingappa. She also sang under her own music compositions.  She sang more often in the 1950s while during the 1960s, she was only sought in songs that needed more than one female voice.

Playback singers Rajalakshmi sang with
Rajalakshmi sang immemorable duets mostly with T. M. Soundararajan. Other include Seerkazhi Govindarajan, P. B. Sreenivas, S. C. Krishnan, M. Balamurali Krishna, A. L. Raghavan, T. S. Kumaresh, Saibaba, K. Veeramani, Pithapuram Nageswara Rao, Kovai Soundarajan, Kumar and K. J. Yesudas.

She also sang duets with female singers with most notably with her sister Soolamangalam Jayalakshmi, P. Leela and P. Susheela. Others are L. R. Eswari, Radha Jayalakshmi, M. L. Vasanthakumari, T. V. Rathnam, K. Jamuna Rani, S. Janaki, Jikki, T. S. Bagavathi, B. Vasantha, A. G. Rathnamala, K. Jamuna Rani, K. Rani, Swarnalatha, A. P. Komala, M. R. Vijaya, Renuka, Kamala, Sarala and L. R. Anjali.

The singing actors she sang with were M. K. Thyagaraja Bhagavathar, V. Nagayya, T. R. Mahalingam, J. P. Chandrababu and K. R. Ramasamy.

Music director 
Rajalakshmi assisted S. M. Subbaiah Naidu in Konjum Salangai. Both Jayalakshmi and Rajalakshmi as music directors by the name Soolamangalam Sisters composed music for films like Dharisanam (1970), Tiger Thaathachari (1974), Appothe Sonnene Kettiya (1979) and Pillaiyar (1984). They also sang under their own compositions.

Soolamangalam Jayalakshmi

Soolamangalam Rajalakshmi

Deaths 
Rajalakshmi died on 1 March 1992, aged only 51, because of cardiac arrest and gastritis which lasted for about 12 years. Jayalakshmi was strongly affected by her sister's death. She outlived her for 25 years and died at her home in Chennai on 29 June 2017, aged 80.

References

External links
Article on Soolamangalam Sisters in Kalyana Malai

1937 births
2017 deaths
Tamil singers
Women Carnatic singers
Carnatic singers
Sibling musical duos
Indian musical duos
Indian women classical singers
Singers from Tamil Nadu
20th-century Indian singers
People from Thanjavur district
20th-century Indian women singers
Women musicians from Tamil Nadu